Päivi Kairamo (former Kairamo-Hella, born 10 April 1964) is a Finnish diplomat and civil servant. She has been working as Head of the United Nations Permanent Representation to Geneva  from 1 July 2012.

Kairamo was appointed as Finland's ambassador to Turkey on 1 September 2016

Kairamo is a Bachelor of Law degree by education.

She graduated from the University of Helsinki in 1990 and started her career at the Ministry of Labor in 1991. Kairamo worked as a government secretary in the Ministry until 1995. At the Ministry for Foreign Affairs, Kairamo worked as a commercial council in 1995-1997 and 1998 and in Parliament as Committee on Social Affairs and Health 1997.

Between 1998 and 2000, Kairamo served as a specialist in Finland's permanent EU delegation. She worked as a European Commission official for 2000-2005. Kairamo was the Foreign Policy Advisor to the President of the Republic of Finland 2005-2009 and at the Office of the President 2009-2012.

Kairamo is a Social Democrat.

Kairamo's father was Aimo Kairamo's former editor-in-chief of the Finnish Social Democrat newspaper.

References 

Ambassadors of Finland to Turkey
Permanent Representatives of Finland to the United Nations
1964 births
Finnish women diplomats
Finnish women lawyers
Living people
Finnish women ambassadors
20th-century Finnish lawyers